Bettoni is an Italian surname. Notable people with the surname include:

 Count Lorenzo Bettoni ennobled in 1684 in Venice, Italy
 Count Francesco Bettoni Cazzago (1835–1898), writer and professor at the University of Padua, Italy.
 Count Federico Bettoni Cazzago (1865–1923), President of the Italian Red Cross 
 Count Alessandro Bettoni Cazaggo (1892–1951), a rider and military career, in part in Olympic Games of London in 1948
David Bettoni (born 1971), French former professional football player and coach
Eduardo Bettoni (born 1990), Brazilian judoka 
Patrick Bettoni (born 1975), Swiss–Italian footballer
Samuele Bettoni (born 1989), Italian footballer
Vincenzo Bettoni (1881–1954), Italian opera singer

See also
Villa Bettoni, Gargnano

Italian-language surnames